WQBS-FM (107.7 FM), branded on-air as Mix 107, is a radio station broadcasting an Urban Adult Contemporary format. Licensed to Carolina, Puerto Rico, it serves the Puerto Rico area.  The station is currently owned by International Broadcasting Corporation.

WQBS-FM is widely credited as having pioneered the Hurban (short for "Hispanic Urban") radio format. This format mixes English-language rap and R&B with Latin rap, Latin pop and reggaeton.

Personalities such as the announcer Luis J. Ortiz "El Coyote" are recognized for their great contribution to this platform since its inception, positioning urban music in Puerto Rico and countries where the signal of this radio arrived. In addition, recently recognized new communicators outside of radio have been added to renew the radio, one of them is Danya Santana, Maiky Backstage and Richie in the House.

References

External links

QBS-FM
Radio stations established in 1967
Urban adult contemporary radio stations
1967 establishments in Puerto Rico
Carolina, Puerto Rico